Chamani Roshini Seneviratne (born 14 November 1978) is a Sri Lankan cricketer who currently plays for the United Arab Emirates as a right-arm medium bowler and right-handed batter. She previously played internationally for Sri Lanka between 1997 and 2013, appearing in one Test match, 80 One Day Internationals and 32 Twenty20 Internationals.

She scored Sri Lanka's only century in women's Test cricket, with 105* against Pakistan in April 1998. She also became the eighth batter to score a test hundred on debut, and achieved the record for the highest score made by a woman when batting at number 8 or lower in women's Tests. Her 148 runs overall on debut was also the fifth-highest by a woman on Test debut.

In May 2018, she was named in the United Arab Emirates squad for the 2018 ICC Women's World Twenty20 Qualifier tournament. She made her Women's Twenty20 International (WT20I) for the UAE against the Netherlands in the World Twenty20 Qualifier on 7 July 2018.

On 19 February 2019, in the 2019 ICC Women's Qualifier Asia match against Kuwait, she took her first five-wicket haul in WT20Is. In June 2020, Seneviratne was stranded in the UAE, after losing her coaching job in Abu Dhabi due to the COVID-19 pandemic.

References

External links
 
 

1978 births
Living people
People from Anuradhapura
Sri Lankan women cricketers
Sri Lanka women Test cricketers
Sri Lanka women One Day International cricketers
Sri Lanka women Twenty20 International cricketers
Women cricketers who made a century on Test debut
Sri Lanka women cricket captains
Sri Lankan emigrants to the United Arab Emirates
Sri Lankan expatriate sportspeople in the United Arab Emirates
Emirati women cricketers
United Arab Emirates women Twenty20 International cricketers
Dual international cricketers
Slimline Sport Club women cricketers
Colts Cricket Club women cricketers
Sri Lanka Air Force Sports Club women cricketers